The  is a commuter rail line in the Osaka-Kobe-Kyoto Metropolitan Area, owned and operated by West Japan Railway Company (JR West). The 61.3 km (38.1 mi) line runs between Osaka and Wakayama, Japan and has a 1.7 km branchline in a southern Osaka suburb. The name is taken from the second syllable of Osaka and the first syllable of Wakayama.

Services
The terminus of the line in Osaka is Tennōji Station in Tennōji-ku where most of the commuter trains on the line originate and terminate. However, many intercity limited express and rapid trains extend to the Osaka Loop Line beyond Tennōji.

The terminus in Wakayama is Wakayama Station. Some trains from Osaka terminate before Wakayama and some spur off to Kansai Airport Station on the Kansai Airport Line from Hineno Station. Tracks are connected to the Kisei Main Line and some trains continue on from there.

On the 1.7 km branch, only local shuttle trains operate.

Limited express services
Hanwa Line segment in bold. Stations in brackets are only served by some services.
Haruka: // -  - (Izumi-Fuchu) - - 
Kuroshio: Kyoto/Shin-Osaka - Tennoji - (Izumi-Fuchu) - Hineno - (Izumi-Sunagawa) -  ~ /

Commuter services
Local:  - 
Trains stop at every station on the line, and they are operated between Tennoji and Otori in the non-rush hour.
Kishuji Rapid Service: Osaka Loop Line/Tennoji - Wakayama
Trains run on the Osaka Loop Line before entering Hanwa Line at Tennoji with stopping at every station between Tennoji and Fukushima via Tsuruhashi, Kyobashi, and Osaka, then Nishikujo, Bentencho, Taisho and Shin-Imamiya stations (part of trains originate and terminate at Kyobashi). They make rapid service stops throughout the Hanwa Line and stop at every station between Hineno and Wakayama except in the morning and night.

Kansai Airport Rapid Service: Osaka Loop Line/Tennoji - Hineno - Kansai Airport
Trains usually run in tandem with Kishuji Rapid between the Osaka Loop Line and Hineno before splitting off and making every stop on the Kansai Airport Line. They go loop with stops at every station between Tennoji and Fukushima via Tsuruhashi, Kyobashi, and Osaka, then Nishikujo, Bentencho, Taisho and Shin-Imamiya (part of trains originate and terminate at Kyobashi).
Direct Rapid Service: Osaka Loop Line ← Tennoji ← Wakayama/Kansai Airport
Trains run on weekday mornings, and make rapid service stops throughout its route and every stop on the Osaka Loop Line.
Rapid Service: Tennoji - Wakayama
Trains run entirely on the Hanwa Line with extended service to the Kisei Main Line except the non-rush hour.
Stations on the Hanwa Line where trains stop: at Tennōji, Sakaishi, Mikunigaoka, Ōtori, Izumi-Fuchū, Higashi-Kishiwada, Kumatori, Hineno, Izumi-Sunagawa, Kii, Musota and Wakayama

Regional Rapid Service: Tennoji - Hineno/Wakayama

They mainly run between Tennoji and Hineno in the non-rush hour, and also in the morning and as the last train for Hineno.

B-Rapid Service (Discontinued): Tennoji - Wakayama

The first train of the service from Wakayama ran to Shin-Osaka via the Osaka Loop Line and the Umeda Freight Line.

Stations

Hanwa Line
Legend: 

 ● : All trains stop
 ｜: All trains pass
 ○ : Some trains stop
 ↑ : Pass, northbound services only
 ▲: Stop, northbound services only
 ▼: Stop, southbound services only

Local trains stop at all stations.

For limited expresses Haruka and Kuroshio, please see their respective articles.

Higashi-Hagoromo Branch Line

Rolling stock 
All trains are based at Hineno and Suita Depots.

Commuter 
 223-0/2500 series
 225-5000/5100 series

Limited Express 
 271 series (Haruka service, from Spring 2020)
 281 series (Haruka service)
 283 series (Kuroshio service)
 287 series (Kuroshio service)
 289 series (Kuroshio service)

Former

Passenger

JNR, JR West
 51 series
 52 series
 70 series
 72 series
 103 series (until 16 March 2018)
 113 series (until March 2012)
 117 series
 123 series
 165 series
 205-0 series (until 16 March 2018)
 205-1000 series (until 16 March 2018)
 221 series (until March 2012)
 381 series (until 30 October 2015)
 485 series
 KiHa 55 series
 KiHa 58 series
 KiHa 65
 KiHa 81 series
 KiHa 82 series

Hanwa Electric Railway, Nankai Railway
 MoYo 100
 MoTa 300
 KuYo 500
 KuTa 600
 KuTe 700
 KuTa 750
 KuTa 3000
 KuTa 7000

Freight

JNR
 ED16
 EF15

Hanwa Electric Railway, Nankai Railway
 RoKo 1000 (now ED38)
 RoKo 1100
 MoKa 2000
 ED1151 (now Nankai ED5151)

History
The line was opened as a double-track electrified line by the Hanwa Electric Railway in 1929. In 1940, the company was merged with Nankai Railway (predecessor of Nankai Electric Railway) and became the Yamanote Line of Nankai. The Yamanote Line was then nationalized in 1944 and renamed the Hanwa Line.

When Kansai International Airport opened in 1994, the Hanwa Line became one of the main railway links between the city and the airport (along with the Nankai Main Line).

Station numbering was introduced in March 2018 with the Hanwa line being assigned station numbers between JR-R20 and JR-R54.

References

Lines of West Japan Railway Company
1067 mm gauge railways in Japan
Railway lines opened in 1929
1929 establishments in Japan